Sheer may refer to:
Sheer fabric, a semi-transparent and flimsy fabric
Sheer (ship), a measure of longitudinal deck curvature in naval architecture
Sheer curation, a lightweight approach to digital curation
Sheer Islands, Nunavut, Canada
Sheers, a form of two-legged lifting device
Ireen Sheer, a German-British pop singer
The Sheer, a Dutch pop band

See also
Shear (disambiguation)
Shere
Scheer (disambiguation)
Sher (disambiguation)